Honey Creek is a stream in Dade County in the Ozarks of southwest Missouri. It is a tributary of Limestone Creek.

Honey Creek was named for the honeybees along its course.

See also
List of rivers of Missouri

References

Rivers of Dade County, Missouri
Rivers of Missouri